The name Usagi has been used to name four tropical cyclones in the northwestern Pacific Ocean. The name was contributed by Japan and is the Japanese name of the constellation Lepus.
 Tropical Storm Usagi (2001) (T0110, 13W) – struck Vietnam.
 Typhoon Usagi (2007) (T0705, 05W) – struck Japan.
 Typhoon Usagi (2013) (T1319, 17W, Odette) – struck the Philippines and China and one of the strongest typhoons in 2013.
 Tropical Storm Usagi (2018) (T1829, 33W, Samuel) – A Category 2-equivalent typhoon (a Severe Tropical Storm, according to the JMA) that made landfall in the Philippines and Vietnam in November 2018.

Pacific typhoon set index articles